"Break Away" (also known as "Breakaway") is a song written by Benny Gallagher and Graham Lyle and first recorded by Art Garfunkel for his 1975 album Breakaway. Gallagher and Lyle released their own version on their 1976 album, also titled Breakaway.

"Break Away", with backing vocals by David Crosby and Graham Nash, was the third single release from Garfunkel's album. The song peaked at number thirty-nine on the Billboard Hot 100 and, in February 1976, went to number one on the Easy Listening chart for one week.

On the Canadian Adult Contemporary chart, "Break Away" reached number two. It was blocked from reaching the number-one position by Paul Simon's song, "50 Ways to Leave Your Lover".

Gallagher and Lyle, the writers of the song, released their version of "Breakaway" in late 1976, the title track of their Breakaway LP. It charted in the British Isles, reaching number 35 in the UK and number seven in Ireland.

Chart performance

Weekly singles charts
Art Garfunkel

Gallagher & Lyle

Year-end charts

See also
List of number-one adult contemporary singles of 1976 (U.S.)

References

External links
 

1975 songs
1975 singles
1976 singles
1983 singles
Art Garfunkel songs
Songs written by Benny Gallagher
Songs written by Graham Lyle
Gallagher and Lyle songs
Columbia Records singles
A&M Records singles